Vikassheel Insaan Party is an Indian political party, formally launched on  November 4, 2018, by a Bollywood set designer Mukesh Sahani, who campaigned for the Bharatiya Janata Party during the 2015 Bihar Legislative Assembly election. They contested in three Lok Sabha constituencies in 2019 from Madhubani, Muzaffarpur and Khagaria but failed to win any seats. The support base for the party consists mainly of the Nishad community, which comprises 20 sub-castes of fisherman and boatmen.

2020 Bihar Assembly elections 
VIP party was initially aligned to the Mahagathbandhan but amidst confusion in seat sharing due to regressive stance taken by Rashtriya Janata Dal to not give required importance to its small allies, Mukesh Sahani walked out of the alliance. He was welcomed by National Democratic Alliance, and was given a total of 11 seats to contest in Bihar. The party was successful, and though Sahani himself lost the election, his party won four seats.

Mukesh Sahani was later elected to Bihar Legislative Council but not on a six-year term but instead a one and a half year term which expired in July 2022

Defections in 2022 
Mukesh Sahani, the President of the party decided to run against his ally party BJP in the Uttar Pradesh 2022 Legislative Assembly elections and said he would field 160 candidates, he said that his main goal was to "oust the (incumbent) BJP government." He proceeded to field 55 candidates against his ally in Bihar, however none of them were able to win. Following the party's loss in the Uttar Pradesh Elections, a BJP MLA said that his chapter is over in Bihar politics and he should be ousted as the minister and also hinted a coup against him in the party Sahani then proceeded to ignore NDA seat distribution for Bihar Legislative Council elections and again fielded seven candidates against BJP

On 23 March 2022, all three MLAs of the party defected into BJP, leaving the party with no MLAs.

See also 
 Mahagathbandhan (Bihar)

References 

Political parties in Bihar
Political parties established in 2018
2018 establishments in Bihar
Dalit politics
Vikassheel Insaan Party